The Baidu 500 (officially 百度歌曲TOP500) is a list of rankings generated by Chinese search engine Baidu as part of their mp3 downloading service featuring the top 500 songs in the Chinese language. Because it uses a download counter, the ranking is a fair assessment of the relative strength of artists and their music, and as a result has become one of the more recognized rankings in mainland China.

Famous No. 1 Baidu 500 Songs 
Gangnam Style (江南Style) by Psy
Jiangnan (江南, River South) by JJ Lin
Tonghua (童話, Fairy Tale) by Guang Liang (holds the records for the longest time at #1, at 15 weeks)
Qianlizhiwai (千里之外, Faraway) by Jay Chou
Juhuatai (菊花台, Chrysanthemum Terrace) by Jay Chou
青花瓷 by Jay Chou
稻香 by Jay Chou

See also
Software industry in China
China Software Industry Association

References

External links
 The Baidu 500 (In Chinese)

Baidu
Chinese music industry